Juliet Palmer is a contemporary composer living in Toronto, Ontario, Canada

Career
Juliet Kiri Palmer was born in New Zealand in 1967, where she completed graduate studies in composition, clarinet and time-based art at the University of Auckland. She moved to New York City in 1990 to work with interdisciplinary pioneer Meredith Monk and obtained her PhD at Princeton University in 1999. Now living in Toronto, Ontario, Canada, she is an active composer and interdisciplinary artist.

Her compositions cover a wide range from chamber music and dance theatre to orchestral and opera. Palmer's music has been featured in festivals in US, UK, New Zealand, Netherlands, Japan, Italy, France, Austria and Canada.  Her work has been broadcast widely, including radio networks in New Zealand, Australia, the UK, US, Canada and Japan.

A detailed catalogue of her work, including streaming audio and video samples may be found at both the Centre for New Zealand Music and the Canadian Music Centre websites.

Further reading
Steenhuisen, Paul.  "Interview with Juliet Palmer".  In Sonic Mosaics: Conversations with Composers.  Edmonton:  University of Alberta Press, 2009.

References

External links
  SOUNZ (Centre for New Zealand Music)   
  The Canadian Music Centre   

Canadian composers
Living people
New Zealand composers
1967 births
University of Auckland alumni
Princeton University alumni
Canadian women composers